Pūkaha / Mount Bruce National Wildlife Centre is a captive breeding facility and visitor centre located in a protected forest area on State Highway 2 in New Zealand's Tararua district.

Location
Pukaha / Mount Bruce National Wildlife Centre is located on State Highway 2, 30km north of Masterton and 10km south of Eketahuna. 
It is within a 'government purpose' wildlife management reserve that is approximately 57.3ha in area. The National Wildlife Centre Reserve is enclosed on three sides by the larger Pukaha / Mount Bruce scenic reserve of 891ha. These reserves are protected areas under the Reserves Act 1977.

History
The forest was acquired by the government in the 1870s as part of Seventy Mile Bush, which covered the area from Masterton to Central Hawkes Bay before European settlement. Most of the bush was destroyed and converted to farmland, but the 942 hectare Mount Bruce block was protected as a Forest Reserve. Some 55 ha of this was further protected as a Native Bird Reserve, administered by the Wildlife Service.

Local man Elwyn Welch became an expert in captive raising of birds, including endangered birds, leading to successes with South Island takahe (Porphyrio hochstetteri) in the 1950s.

In 1962, the centre was established to breed and release endangered native birds on these 55 hectares. South Island takahe (a very rare bird, thought extinct, but rediscovered in Fiordland) were the first species introduced. In the same decade, a large number of brown teal, buff weka and kākāriki were released.

In 2001 the entire forest became part of the wildlife reserve, extending the area from 55 to 942 hectares, increasing capacity to breed birds and diversified species. About 100 km of tracks were cut and thousands of traps and bait stations were scattered, setting up an area for wildlife with low predator pressure.

Rangitāne – vesting and gifting back
In 2016 a deed was signed between customary landowners Rangitāne iwi (Rangitāne o Tamaki Nui ā Rua and Rangitāne o Wairarapa) and the Crown to settle historical claims made under the Treaty of Waitangi. The settlement included adding the Māori name Pukaha to the names of the Mount Bruce National Wildlife Centre and the Mount Bruce Scenic Reserve. A key part of the settlement was the vesting and gifting back of Pukaha / Mount Bruce. A ceremony to recognise the handover of Pukaha to Rangitāne was held on site on 8 February 2020. On 1 May 2021, a further ceremony was held to celebrate Rangitāne iwi gifting back Pukaha forest to the people of Aotearoa New Zealand.

Governance
The Pukaha / Mount Bruce National Wildlife Centre is operated by the Pukaha Mount Bruce Board, a Registered Charitable Trust. The constitution of the trust describes a three way partnership between Rangitāne, the National Wildlife Centre, and the Department of Conservation.

Pūkaha Mount Bruce missions

Conservation
Its main objective is to help restore native wildlife. Currently, restoration mostly concerns birds although also includes reptiles such as the tuatara. Controlling invasive pest populations is an important means to ensuring the successful rejuvenation of native wildlife in the area. Currently the Goodnature A24 traps are being used in conjunction with other pest control methods with the aim of bringing the rat, stoat, and possum populations down to reduce the threat these animals pose. 

In August 2021, it was announced that the Department of Conservation had committed $700,000 towards the control of rabbits in the area surrounding Pukaha/ Mount Bruce, to help reduce the environmental damage they cause, and also reduce the population of ferrets and cats that prey on rabbits, but also threaten birds in the reserve. 

Bird releases started in 1996 with nine kākā, a kind of parrot. There are now approximately 160 kākā in the forest, and the goal is to have a population of 600 in a few years. North Island brown kiwi and North Island kōkako translocations followed in 2003. Over 15 kiwi are currently living in the forest and two in the nocturnal house, including some chicks. For the breeding programme, they incubate kiwi eggs to protect chicks and thus give them the chance to become adult.

Education
Many schools visit the centre. Some sponsor a kiwi, so they can follow its progress since the release. They participate in the LEOTC (Learning experiences Outside the Classroom) education programme, giving them the chance to see the kiwi and to learn about environmental problems facing New Zealand.  Pūkaha is also known for its holiday programmes, giving local children the chance to be a junior ranger.

In 2020, a new conservation training programme was announced by a regional tertiary education provider UCOL, to be taught in conjunction with Pukaha / Mount Bruce.  The Te Kura Tapere: Certificate in Introductory Conservation is an eight week course taught on-site at Pukaha.

Tourism

The second biggest mission of the centre is welcoming local and international tourists, and to educate them about the environment and wildlife protection including pest control. There are about 40,000 visitors per year.

There are several tourist facilities: a café, aviaries to discover the native birds (including a Behind the Scenes tour) and the nocturnal house where they can see the shy kiwi. There are guided visits and a daily feeding demonstrations for kākā and eels.  Pūkaha also offers a night tour to look for the kiwi at night and visit the glow worm cave.

One of the notable attractions at the wildlife reserve was a rare white kiwi named Manukura. This bird was the first white kiwi hatched in captivity.  New Zealand author Joy Cowley wrote a picture story book for children about the white kiwi. Manukura died following surgery on 27 December 2020, aged 10.

Staff
There are currently 30 staff and around 50 volunteers. The team works in various areas including forest regeneration, pest control, the visitor centre, communications, and in the café. 

It is closed only on Christmas Day.

References

External links

 Pukaha official web site
 New Zealand Department of Conservation
 Rangitāne Tū Mai Rā (Wairarapa Tamaki nui-ā-Rua) Claims Settlement Act 2017

Tourist attractions in the Wellington Region
Tararua District
Nature reserves in New Zealand
Wildlife sanctuaries of New Zealand
Protected areas of the Wellington Region
Wildlife rehabilitation and conservation centers
Nature centers
Eketāhuna